Soltmurad Dzhabrailovich Bakayev (born 5 August 1999) is a Russian football player who plays for FC Rubin Kazan. His primary position is right winger, and he played as left winger as well.

Club career
He made his debut in the Russian Football National League for FC Spartak-2 Moscow on 17 July 2018 in a game against PFC Sochi.

He made his Russian Premier League debut for Spartak on 25 August 2019 in a game against PFC Krylia Sovetov Samara.

On 22 January 2020 he signed a 5-year contract with FC Rubin Kazan.

Personal life
His older brother Zelimkhan Bakayev is also a footballer.

Career statistics

References

External links
 
 Profile by Russian Football National League

1999 births
People from Nazran
Living people
Russian footballers
Russia youth international footballers
Russia under-21 international footballers
Association football midfielders
FC Spartak Moscow players
FC Spartak-2 Moscow players
FC Rubin Kazan players
Russian Premier League players
Russian First League players